Ciarán Wallace (born 1995) is an Irish hurler who plays for Kilkenny Intermediate Championship club Erin's Own and at inter-county level with the Kilkenny senior hurling team. He usually lines out as a left corner-back.

Honours

Kilkenny
All-Ireland Junior Football Championship: 2022
Leinster Minor Hurling Championship (1): 2013

References

1995 births
Living people
Erin's Own (Kilkenny) hurlers
Kilkenny inter-county hurlers
Kilkenny inter-county Gaelic footballers